Aleksandr Nikiforovich Aksyonov (Aleksandr Aksionau; 9 October 1924 – 8 September 2009) was a Soviet politician and diplomat from Belarus. Aksyonov served as the Prime Minister of the Byelorussian Soviet Socialist Republic from 11 December 1978, until 8 July 1983. He later became the Soviet Ambassador to Poland from 1983-86.

Aksyonov died on 8 September 2009, at the age of 84.

References

1924 births
2009 deaths
People from Vietka District
Central Committee of the Communist Party of the Soviet Union members
Seventh convocation members of the Soviet of Nationalities
Eighth convocation members of the Soviet of Nationalities
Ninth convocation members of the Soviet of the Union
Tenth convocation members of the Soviet of the Union
Members of the Central Committee of the Communist Party of Byelorussia
Heads of government of the Byelorussian Soviet Socialist Republic
People's Commissars for Internal Affairs of the Byelorussian Soviet Socialist Republic
Members of the Supreme Soviet of the Byelorussian SSR (1955–1959)
Members of the Supreme Soviet of the Byelorussian SSR (1959–1962)
Members of the Supreme Soviet of the Byelorussian SSR (1962–1966)
Members of the Supreme Soviet of the Byelorussian SSR (1971–1974)
Members of the Supreme Soviet of the Byelorussian SSR (1975–1979)
Members of the Supreme Soviet of the Byelorussian SSR (1980–1985)
Recipients of the Order of Lenin
Recipients of the Order of the Red Banner of Labour
Ambassadors of the Soviet Union to Poland